Bregenz is the capital of Vorarlberg, the westernmost state of Austria. The city lies on the east and southeast shores of Lake Constance, the third-largest freshwater lake in Central Europe, between Switzerland in the west and Germany in the northwest.

Bregenz is located on a plateau falling in a series of terraces to the lake at the foot of Pfänder mountain. It is a junction of the arterial roads from the Rhine valley to the German Alpine foothills, with cruise ship services on Lake Constance.

It is famous for the annual summer music festival Bregenzer Festspiele, as well as the dance festival Bregenzer Spring.

History

The first settlements date from 1500 BC. The Brigantii are mentioned by Strabo as a Celtic sub-tribe in this region of the Alps. In the 5th century BC, the Celts settled at Brigantion, which became one of their most heavily fortified locations. After a series of battles in 15 BC, the Romans conquered Brigantion and the city became a Roman camp. It was conferred the status of a municipality (Brigantium) around 50 AD and was the seat of the Roman admiralty for Lake Constance. In 259/60 Brigantium was destroyed by the Alemanni, Germanic peoples who settled in the area in around 450.

From 610 to 612 Saint Columbanus and Saint Gall worked as missionaries in Bregenz. From 917 onwards the castle served as a residence of the Udalrichinger (ruling dynasty of Vorarlberg), who called themselves Counts of Bregenz. The house died out around 1150. The son of the first Ulrich was Saint Gebhard, born in 947. He became the Bishop of Konstanz. In around 1170 Hugo of Tübingen (Montfort) founded a town settlement (first documented in 1249), enlarged it in the 13th and 14th centuries and from 1650 to 1652.

The city was sold in 1451, and again in 1523, to the Habsburgs and continued under Austrian rule, with a brief occupation by Swedish forces under Carl Gustaf Wrangel during the 30 Years' War, until the 19th century. Bregenz was under Bavarian rule from 1805 to 1814. From 1842 to 1850, the harbour on Lake Constance was built, then enlarged in 1883 and from 1889 to 1891, and Austrian ship service was inaugurated in 1884. Railway services have existed since 1872, and since 1884 across the Arlberg massif.

Since 1726, Bregenz has been the main seat of Austrian administration in Vorarlberg (Obervogtei, in 1786 Kreisamt, since 1861 seat of the Landtag, since 1918 seat of the Landeshauptmann). Rieden-Vorkloster and Fluh were incorporated into Bregenz in 1919 and 1946, respectively. The town was bombed by the Allies in 1945, and 72 houses were destroyed.

Population

Main sights

Upper town
Remains from the 13th and 16th centuries
Town walls 
Old town hall (1662)
Martinsturm (Martin's Tower). Originally built by the Romans, it has a chapel with frescoes dating from 1362. Between 1599 and 1601 an additional storey was added. It has the largest bulb-shaped Baroque steeple in Central Europe, and houses the Museum of Military History.
Gothic parish church of St Gall: its Romanesque foundations date from before 1380, but it was rebuilt around 1480. Around 1737 it was converted to a Baroque style.
Herz-Jesu parish church (1905–1908).

Lower town
Town hall, built in 1686 (façade from 1898) 
Gothic Seekapelle (Lake Chapel)
Landhaus (built from 1973 to 1982 by W. Holzbauer)
Former Kornhausmarkt (built 1838 to 1940, altered 1951 to 1955); it now houses a theatre.
Protestant church of the Sacred Cross (1862–1864)
Church of St Kolumban (1962–1966)
Kunsthaus Bregenz (1991–1997) (modern art museum)
Tourismushaus (tourist centre) (1994–1998).

Sights in the district of Vorkloster include the Maria Hilf parish church (1925–1931, by C. Holzmeister, interior from 1980) and the Cistercian monastery of Mehrerau.

On the Gebhardsberg rock are remains of the fortress of Hohenbregenz (destroyed by the Swedes in 1647).

Businesses and services

Government 
Bregenz is the seat of the Vorarlberg State Assembly (Landtag), and of most of the provincial authorities/institutions of Vorarlberg (e.g. school superintendent, police headquarters, department of human resources development (AMS), Office for Environmental Protection, Chamber of Labour, Economics Chamber, Chamber of Agriculture, Chamber of Pharmacists, military regional headquarters, military garrison, one of the main hospitals of the province (Landeskrankenhaus), as well as a sanatorium, farmers' health and social insurance office, VLV (Mutual Fire Insurance Institute).

Consulates
A consulate-general of Turkey, and honorary consulates of Belarus, France, Germany, Hungary, Norway, and Switzerland are located in Bregenz. Honorary consulates of Finland and the United Kingdom are located in nearby Lauterach, and an honorary consulate of Brazil in nearby Hard.

Schools and the arts
Bregenz is home to four Gymnasium secondary schools, a commercial college (HAK), a technical college (HTL), upper secondary business schools (Höhere Lehranstalt für wirtschaftliche Berufe), three Berufsschulen (vocational schools), crafts colleges, the Academy of Social Sciences, and a nursing school. Others include: an adult education centre, school boarding houses, state archives, a state library, a state museum, Kunsthaus Bregenz (modern arts centre), Künstlerhaus (art centre), Thurn und Taxis Palace, five monasteries, Heimatwerk (autonomous institution fostering the manufacturing of traditional craft products), and various newspapers.

Public facilities
Festival and Congress centre, Theater am Kornmarkt, casino, harbour for sailing boats and yachts, cable car up onto the Pfänder mountain.

Economy
The economy is mainly dominated by small businesses in the services, trade and industry sectors: these include the textile industry (Wolford AG), fittings manufacturer Julius Blum GmbH, glass processing and machine construction.

Bi-seasonal tourism is important; a major attraction is the Bregenz Festival (since 1946, floating stage since 1949, modernised in 1979, Festival and Congress Hall in 1980), winter sports on the Pfänder mountain.

Culture

Bregenzer Festspiele 

The annual summer music festival Bregenzer Festspiele is world-famous, taking place in July and August each year on and around a stage on Lake Constance. This festival attracts more than 150,000 people every year to Bregenz (2011: 166,453, 2016: 159,172) and has a budget of around EUR 20 million. The program changes every two years.

In addition to playing on the lake stage, orchestral concerts and operas also take place in the adjacent festival theatre. There is also a children's and youth program during and before the beginning of the festival.

The lake stage (Seebühne) is the largest open-air lake stage theatre in the world, with an audience capacity of around 7,000.

Bregenz Jazz Festival 
Since 2014, the Bregenz Jazz Festival has been held every year in June at the Kornmarktplatz. It is the successor of the New Orleans Festival, which took place from 1999 to 2013, during the early summer, in the inner city of Bregenz, and which was no longer supported by the initiator Markus Linder. In addition to the change of name, there was also a musical genre change from blues to jazz. The location and the timing stayed roughly the same.

Bregenzer Frühling 
Since 1987, Bregenzer Spring, a dance festival, has been held every year between March and June in the Festival Hall of Bregenz (Festspielhaus). Dance ensembles from all over the world perform their new productions, along with Austrian premieres. With a budget of around EUR 500,000 and up to 10,000 visitors, Bregenzer Spring is one of the most important dance festivals in Austria.

Others 
 In 2013/2019 a Roman Theatre was excavated in Bregenz.
 The Galgenbihl (gallow hill) is almost forgotten.

Climate

Sport
 A1 Bregenz HB is a handball team.
 SC Bregenz is the football team of the town, competing in the Austrian Regional League (Third Division).

Notable people

Public service & commerce 

 Wolf Dietrich von Raitenau (1559 in Lochau – 1617), Prince-Archbishop of Salzburg, 1587/1612
 Josef Fessler (1813 in Lochau – 1872), Roman Catholic Bishop of Sankt Pölten
 Victor von Ebner (1842 in Bregenz – 1925), Austrian anatomist and histologist
 Johann Georg Hagen (1847–1930), Jesuit priest and astronomer
 Jodok Fink (1853 in Andelsbuch – 1929), Austrian farmer and politician, first Vice-Chancellor of Austria, from 1919 to 1920
 Valentin Feurstein (1885–1970), Austrian general in the Wehrmacht during World War II.
 Lorenz Bohler (1885 in Wolfurt – 1973), surgeon, an innovator of accident surgery, Nazi
 Irmfried Eberl (1910–1948), psychiatrist and commander of Treblinka extermination camp
 Hermann Gmeiner (1919 – 1986), philanthropist and founder of SOS Children's Villages
 Fritz Mayer, (German Wiki) (1933–1988), politician, mayor of Bregenz, 1970 to 1988
 Herbert Sausgruber (born 1946 in Bregenz), governor of Vorarlberg, 1997-2011
 İlber Ortaylı (born 1947 in Bregenz), Turkish historian and professor of history  
 Günter Bischof (born 1953 in Mellau), Austrian-American historian and university professor
 Ernst Fehr (born 1956 in Hard) Austrian behavioral economist and neuroeconomist
 Anton Amann (1956 in Bregenz – 2015), Austrian chemist and professor of chemistry at the Innsbruck Medical University
 Hans-Peter Martin (born 1957), journalist and politician, member of the European Parliament

The Arts 

 Johann Conrad Dorner (1810 in Egg – 1866), Austrian painter
 Kaspar Albrecht (1889 in Au – 1970), architect and sculptor
 Karl Michael Vogler (1928–2009), actor, raised in Bregenz
 Sieghardt Rupp (1931–2015), actor 
 Robert Schneider (born 1961), writer of novels and poetry
 Stefan Sagmeister (born 1962), graphic designer
 Markus Gasser (born 1967), literary scientist and author
 Arno Geiger (born 1968 in Wolfurt), Austrian novelist
 Roman Rafreider (born 1969 in Bregenz), Austrian television host and journalist
 Christof Unterberger (born 1970), cellist and film composer
 Maria Anwander (born 1980), conceptual artist, performance and installation art
 Lukas Birk (born 1982), photographer
 Jakob Kasimir Hellrigl (born 1993), known as Candy Ken, rapper
 Egon Huber (1905-1960), designer, ceramicist, sculptor, and installation artist

Sport 
 Max Sick (Maxick) (1882–1961), German strongman and gymnast
 Patrick Ortlieb (born 1967), former World Cup alpine ski racer and Olympic gold medalist
 Aleksandar Đorđević (born 1981), an Austrian footballer with over 300 club caps

Twin towns

Bregenz is twinned with:

  Bangor, Northern Ireland – various exchange trips take place between the two places.
  Acre, Israel

References

External links 

 
 http://www.bregenz.at Official site (in German)
 http://www.pfaender.at Official site (German/English/Italiano/Français) of the Pfänder Mountain
 http://www.pfaenderbahn.at (in German)
 http://www.scbregenz.at Official site (in German) of local Football Club
 Bregenzer Festspiele/ Bregenze Festival website
 Bregenz Tourism Information

 
Austrian state capitals
Cities and towns in Bregenz District
Populated places on Lake Constance
Populated places established in the 2nd millennium BC
2nd-millennium BC establishments
Vorarlberg